Targen or Ta'ergen is a town in Xinlin District, Daxing'anling Prefecture, Heilongjiang, China.

References 

Daxing'anling Prefecture
Township-level divisions of Heilongjiang